Josh Young is an American actor best known for appearing on Broadway in the revival of Jesus Christ Superstar as Judas and Amazing Grace, originating the role of John Newton.

Early life and education
Young was raised in Wallingford, Pennsylvania, and his family is Conservative Jewish. He trained at the Pennsylvania Governors School for the Arts and holds a B.F.A. in Musical Theatre from Syracuse University.

Career
In 2005, Young performed as Tony in the 50th-anniversary international tour of West Side Story.

He performed in several shows in the Stratford Festival, including The Grapes of Wrath (Connie), Evita (Che), and Kiss Me Kate (Paul).

For his role as Che in Evita, he won the Broadway World Toronto Award for Best Actor in a Musical. He then played Marius in a tour of Les Misérables.

From 2011 to 2012, Young played the role of Judas in the revival of Jesus Christ Superstar for which he was nominated for the Tony Award for Best Featured Actor in a Musical. On May 8, 2012, he won the Theatre World Award for an outstanding Broadway debut performance for this role.

In March 2013, Young performed "Bring On the Men" from the Broadway musical Jekyll & Hyde at Broadway Cares/Equity Fights AIDS fundraising concert Broadway Backwards.

In 2015, he starred in the musical Amazing Grace on Broadway in the role of John Newton.  He can be heard on the cast recording, which was released in February 2016. He won a Broadway World Award for this role in the Chicago Premiere at Bank of America Theatre.

In 2019, Young joined the faculty of Oakland University.

Personal life
On January 12, 2017, Young got engaged to actress Emily Padgett. They were married on June 3, 2018. The couple welcomed their first child, a daughter, in February 2019. They had a son in November 2020.

Discography
 Amazing Grace: The Musical: Original Broadway Cast Recording
 Where the Sky Ends: The Songs of Michael Mott (Track: "Her Embrace" from Faustus)
 Still Dreaming of Paradise (solo album)
 Josh Young (self titled debut album)

References

External links
 

American male musical theatre actors
Syracuse University alumni
Living people
Jewish American male actors
1980 births
Theatre World Award winners
21st-century American Jews